Catani is an Italian surname. Notable people with the surname include:

Carlo Catani (1852–1918), Australian civil engineer
Claudia Catani (born 1969), Italian actress and voice actress
Ina Catani (1906–1938), Swedish archer
Luigi Catani (1762–1840), Italian painter
Vittorio Catani (born 1940), Italian writer

Italian-language surnames